Matilda Bay or Crawley Bay (known originally as Currie's Bay, then Sutherland's Bay) is a natural bay in the Swan River in Western Australia, adjacent to the Perth suburb of Crawley.  It extends from Pelican Point to Mounts Bay Road below Kings Park.

The University of Western Australia is immediately opposite.  Other landmarks on Matilda Bay include Matilda Bay Restaurant, Pelican Point Sea Scouts, Royal Perth Yacht Club, UWA Rowing Club and Mounts Bay Sailing Club.

A well-known bronze sculpture that is located at the site of the former Crawley Baths – Eliza is displayed just offshore from Mounts Bay Road and depicts a woman preparing to dive.

Matilda Bay Reserve is a recreational parkland between Hackett Drive and the river.  It includes Pelican Point, which is an important breeding sanctuary for migratory birds.

Matilda Bay is believed to have been named after the wife of John Septimus Roe, Matilda (née Bennett).

History

Captain Currie was the first colonial owner of the  estate surrounding the bay, at that time known as Currie's Bay. Pelican Point was then known as Point Currie.  The estate was sold in 1832 to the Assistant Surveyor and Colonial Treasurer, Henry Charles Sutherland for £100. Sutherland named the property Crawley Park after his mother's maiden name and the bay became known as Sutherland's Bay. In 1876 Crawley Park was sold to Sir George Shenton, and the bay was known generally as Crawley Bay. After Shenton's death in 1909, the estate was acquired by the Government in 1910 and vested in the University of Western Australia in 1912.

Some of the present foreshore, west of Crawley Baths, was created by land reclamation to allow Mounts Bay Road to be widened.

The US Navy had a fleet of 60 Catalina flying boats based at Matilda Bay during World War II, part of Naval Base Perth.

In 1943, Qantas operated five Catalina flying boats between Ceylon (now Sri Lanka) and Matilda Bay in what was known as the Double Sunrise service.

Image gallery

See also
 Matilda Bay Brewing Company

References

External links
Recent aerial photos by Richard Woldendorp 
Earlier photographs of the Supermarina Southampton II flying boats by Reg Lambert  and Izzy Orloff of the same planes in 1928 

Swan River (Western Australia)
Bays of Western Australia
Crawley, Western Australia